The 2004 Connecticut Huskies football team represented the University of Connecticut in the 2004 NCAA Division I-A football season as a member of the Big East Conference. The team was led by sixth-year head coach Randy Edsall and played its home games at Rentschler Field in East Hartford, Connecticut.

Schedule

References

Connecticut
UConn Huskies football seasons
Little Caesars Pizza Bowl champion seasons
Connecticut Huskies football